The Jon Cornish Trophy, also known as the Cornish Award, is an award given annually to the top Canadian player in NCAA football. The award is named after Canadian Football Hall of Famer (CFHOF) Jon Cornish and has been presented since 2017, with the trophy debuting two years later on display at the CFHOF.

It is awarded by a panel consisting of Canadian journalists, player personnel evaluators from the Canadian Football League, former NCAA players with a connection to Canada, and panelists from Gridiron Nation. Nathan Rourke and John Metchie III are the only two to have ever won it more than once.

History 
The trophy was first awarded at the conclusion of the 2017 NCAA football season to honor the top Canadian player in American college football, where it was presented to Ohio Bobcats quarterback Nathan Rourke from Oakville, Ontario. The award is named after Jon Cornish, a former running back at the University of Kansas who would later play for the as a member of the Calgary Stampeders of the Canadian Football League, where he would win three Most Outstanding Canadian awards as well as the CFL's Most Outstanding Player Award and Lou Marsh Trophy in 2013 before being inducted into the Canadian Football Hall of Fame in 2019.

Rourke would win the award again the following season before Oklahoma State running back and Sherwood Park native Chuba Hubbard was named the winner for the 2019–20 season. Alabama wide receiver and Brampton local John Metchie III won the award for the 2020–21 and 2021–22 seasons.

The patrons of the trophy are the Northern 8 group led by businessman L. David Dube and project partner and Football Canada president Jim Mullin. It is awarded by a panel consisting of Canadian journalists, Canadian Football League player personnel evaluators, former NCAA players with a connection to Canada, and panelists from Gridiron Nation.

Winners

See also 
 Hec Crighton Trophy – award for the top player in U Sports football

References 

Canadian sports trophies and awards
2017 establishments in Canada
Awards established in 2017